The Women's World Invitation Tournament, also known as the Chunghua Cup, was a triennial global invitational tournament for national and club teams in women's association football. It was held four times, in Taipei, Taiwan.

History
It was one of the most prestigious women's football events, prior to the advent of the Women's World Cup and Women's Olympic Football. The competitions were organised by the Chinese Taipei Football Association and their success brought pressure on the global governing body FIFA to organise its own women's football tournaments.

SSG Bergisch Gladbach of West Germany was the most successful participant, with two titles. They signed Taiwan's Chou Tai-ying after the 1987 tournament.

Results

References

External links
RSSSF.com history page, with links to full results

International association football competitions in Asia
International association football competitions hosted by Taiwan
Women's football in Taiwan
Recurring sporting events established in 1978
International women's association football invitational tournaments